John Franklin Prentice, Jr. (October 17, 1920 – May 23, 1999) was an American cartoonist most known for taking over the comic strip Rip Kirby upon the death of the strip's creator, Alex Raymond.

Early life
John Prentice was born in Whitney, Texas, on October 17, 1920, on his family's farm. Some of Prentice's relatives were willing to help him pay for college, but on the condition that he study "medicine, law, or business." However, as Prentice always wanted to be an artist, he joined the Navy in 1939 to help pay for college, and served until 1945. During his service, he was stationed at Pearl Harbor on December 7, 1941, when it was attacked by Japanese forces.

Early work
After his time in the Navy, Prentice briefly attended the Art Institute of Pittsburgh, and then moved to New York City, where he worked in a variety of illustration and comic-book jobs.

In the late 1940s and early 1950s, Prentice worked for Joe Simon and Jack Kirby's romance comics series Young Romance, which is often considered the first romance comic. Originally published by Crestwood Publications, the series eventually moved to DC Comics, for which Prentice also worked in the mid-1950s.

Among the most notable of his comic-book illustration work for DC Comics were for titles such as House of Secrets, Tales of the Unexpected, Gang Busters, and the first issue of Showcase. Showcases inaugural issue introduced the character Fireman Farrell, a co-creation of Prentice and writer Arnold Drake's. The character went on to cameo in such titles as Crisis on Infinite Earths #7, putting out a fire, and Batman & Superman: World's Finest #4, where he is shown to be a captain in the Metropolis Fire Department.

Rip Kirby

On September 6, 1956, Flash Gordon creator Alex Raymond was killed in a car crash, leaving his current comic strip, Rip Kirby, without an illustrator. Sylvan Byck, editor for King Features Syndicate (which published Rip Kirby), originally approached Prentice's longtime friend Leonard Starr to take over, though when he turned it down in hopes of getting his own strip picked up, Starr recommended Prentice, instead. Prentice drew the strip for the rest of its run, until just before his own death in 1999.

Prentice had several notable assistants on Rip Kirby: Al McWilliams (pre-1960), Al Williamson (1960–63), and Gray Morrow (1970s).

Prentice received the National Cartoonists Society Story Comic Strip Award for Rip Kirby in 1966, 1967, and 1986.

Personal life
John Prentice married his first wife, Margie, in 1945, and their only child, John III, was born in 1948. The two officially divorced in 1956.

Prentice married his second wife, Cathy, in 1957, with whom he had three more children: Whitney, Cathy, and Priscilla. Eventually, the two of them divorced, as well. (His ex-wife Cathy went on to marry Beetle Bailey creator Mort Walker.)

Prentice married a third time to Antonia, and the two were married until his death in 1999 from mesothelioma. This condition was attributed to his time working as a fireman in the Navy, as the pipes had asbestos around them.

References

External links
NCS Awards

American comics artists
1920 births
1999 deaths
People from Whitney, Texas
United States Navy personnel of World War II